A modified uniformly redundant array  (MURA)  is a type of mask used in coded aperture imaging. They were first proposed by Gottesman and Fenimore in 1989.

Mathematical Construction of MURAs

MURAs can be generated in any length L that is prime and of the form

the first five such values being .

These linear MURA arrays can also be arranged to form hexagonal MURA arrays.

As with any mask in coded aperture imaging, an inverse sequence must also be constructed. In the MURA case, this inverse G can be constructed easily given the original coding pattern A: 

Rectangular MURA arrays are constructed in a slightly different manner, letting , where

and 

The corresponding decoding function G is constructed as follows:

References 

Radiation